Graham Norton (born 1963) is an Irish television and radio presenter.

Graham or Graeme Norton may also refer to:
Graham Norton (Gaelic footballer), Irish Gaelic football player
Graeme Norton, New Zealand rugby league player and coach